Zander Schloss (born August 7, 1961) is an American musician, actor and composer. He is known as bass player for the Circle Jerks, the Weirdos, his many collaborations with Joe Strummer musically and in film and for his contributions to independent feature films.

His first screen appearance was as "Kevin the Nerd" in Repo Man. He went on to appear in a number of Alex Cox films as well as to make significant musical contributions in other Cox features such as Sid and Nancy (1986), Straight to Hell (1987), Walker (1987), El Patrullero (1991) and The Winner (1996).

Discography
 Sean Wheeler and Zander Schloss
 Walk Thee Invisible (album) (2010, LP)
 Other Desert Cities (album) (2014, LP)
 with Joe Strummer
 Walker (1987, LP)
 Permanent Record (1988, LP)
 Trash City (1988, LP)
 Earthquake Weather (1989, LP)
 with Die' Hunns
 You Rot Me (2006, LP)
 The Gousters (2005, LP)
 with Thelonious Monster
 Beautiful Mess (1992, LP)
 with Bob Forrest
 Modern Folk and Blues Wednesday (2006, LP)
 with The Too Free Stooges
 Roadside Prophets (1992, LP)
 with Magnificent Bastards
 Working Class Hero (1995, LP)
 Mockingbird Girl (1995, LP)
 12 Bar Blues (1998, LP)
 with Low and Sweet Orchestra
 Goodbye to All That (1996, LP)
 with Mike Watt
 Ball-Hog or Tugboat? (1994, LP)
 with Robi Draco Rosa
 Frio (1991, LP)
 Vino (2008, LP)
 with Stan Ridgway
 Floundering (1994, LP)
 with Mike Martt
 Tomorrow Shines Bright (2003, LP)
 with The Weirdos
 Live on the Radio (2004, LP)
 with the Circle Jerks
 Wonderful (1985, LP)
 Sid & Nancy (1986, LP)
 VI (1987, LP)
 Gig (1991, LP)
 Oddities, Abnormalities and Curiosities (1995, LP)
 The Show Must Go Off! (2005, DVD)
 TBA (2008/2009, LP)
 with Pray for Rain
 Straight to Hell (1987, LP)
 with the Juicy Bananas
 Repo Man (1984, LP)

Soundtracks
 Repo Man (1984)
 Sid & Nancy (1986)
 Straight to Hell (1987)
 Walker (1987)
 Tapeheads (1988)
 Permanent Record (1988)
 El Patrullero (1991)
 Roadside Prophets (1992)
 Money for Nothing (1993)
 Floundering (1994)
 Tank Girl (1995)
 The Winner (1996)
 The Beatnicks (1996)

Filmography
 Repo Man: Kevin (1984)
 Straight to Hell: Karl (1987)
 Walker: Huey (1987)
 Tapeheads: Heavy Metal Fan (1988)
 Money for Nothing (1993)
 Floundering (1994)
 Desperate But Not Serious (1999)
 Fear of a Punk Planet (2001)
 That Darn Punk (2001)
 Average Man (2005)
 American Hardcore: Himself (2006)
 The Future is Unwritten: Himself (2007)
 Repo Chick (2009)
 Bob and the Monster: Himself (2011)

References

External links
 Official Zander Website
 Official Sean and Zander Website
 

Living people
1958 births
American male composers
20th-century American composers
American male film actors
American punk rock bass guitarists
American male bass guitarists
Circle Jerks members
Male actors from St. Louis
Musical groups from Los Angeles
Guitarists from Los Angeles
20th-century American bass guitarists
20th-century American male musicians